North Battleford Airport  is located  east of North Battleford, Saskatchewan, Canada.

History

World War II 
The airport was built during World War II as part of the British Commonwealth Air Training Plan and was known as RCAF Station North Battleford. The station hosted the Royal Air Force's No. 35 Service Flying Training School RAF from September 4, 1941 to February 25, 1944, and then No. 13 Service Flying Training School RCAF until March 30, 1945. Relief airfields were located at Brada and Hamlin.

Aerodrome information  
Six runways were listed as follows:

Relief landing field – Brada 
The site was located east of the community of Brada, Saskatchewan. The relief field was constructed in the typical triangular pattern.

Though listed as a turf all way field, three runways were listed as follows:

A review of Google Maps on June 7, 2018 shows no visibility of the airfield at the listed coordinates.

Postwar (1945-2010) 

Postwar it became known as North Battleford (Cameron McIntosh) after Cameron Ross McIntosh. It was transferred from Transport Canada to the City of North Battleford on January 1, 1997.
In April 2010 a contract was awarded for renovations to the air terminal building.

Present (2010- ) 
The North Battleford Gliding Centre, a Royal Canadian Air Cadets gliding centre, stores its gliders outside in permanent tie downs, and has office space in a trailer. The gliding centre conducts winch and air-tow operations in both the spring and the fall. The gliding centre currently operates two gliders, Number 2 (C-GCLS) and Number 10 (C-GRFQ); one winch, and one Bellanca Scout Towplane #5 (C-GBAZ).

See also 
 List of airports in Saskatchewan
 North Battleford/Hamlin Airport

References

External links
Page about this airport on COPA's Places to Fly airport directory

Certified airports in Saskatchewan
North Battleford